Charles Claude Guthrie (September 26, 1880 – April 1963) was an American physiologist.

Early life and education
He was born at Gilmore, Missouri. He graduated (M.D.) from the University of Missouri in 1901 and (Ph.D.) from the University of Chicago in 1908.

Career
Guthrie taught physiology while engaged in advanced studies, and was professor of physiology and pharmacology at Washington University in 1906–1909 and at the University of Pittsburgh after 1909. He was author of Blood-Vessel Surgery and its Applications (1912) and of contributions on blood reactions and alterations, resuscitation, cerebral and other anæmias, isolated and ungrafted tissues, and sutures and anastomosis of blood vessels.

Guthrie collaborated in his work on vascular surgery with French physician Alexis Carrel, who won the 1912 Nobel Prize in Physiology or Medicine. Arguments were made that the primary credit for this work should have gone to Guthrie rather than Carrel. However, Guthrie's head transplant experiments likely prevented his Nobel Prize candidacy status.

References

American physiologists
University of Chicago alumni
University of Missouri alumni
People from St. Charles County, Missouri
1880 births
1963 deaths
Washington University in St. Louis faculty